Joseph John Paul McKee (born 31 October 1992 in Glasgow, Scotland) is a Scottish footballer who plays as a midfielder for Dumbarton.

McKee has previously played for Livingston, Burnley, Bolton Wanderers, Greenock Morton, Carlisle United, Falkirk and Queen of the South.

Club career

Early career
McKee started his career in the youth team of Dundee United in 2000 at the age of seven. He spent five years at Tannadice Park and progressed well at the club but left in 2005 due to unhappiness and joined Livingston. He settled well into life at Almondvale, as he knew youth teammate Robert Snodgrass as they went to the same school, St Mungo's Academy in Glasgow. McKee had a successful season for the under-19s in the 2008–09 season scoring 13 goals in 17 starts as they won the league title for the second consecutive season. He signed full-time for the club in October 2008, and went with the first team squad on a training tour to Italy playing against Parma Reserves. In March 2009 he was part of the squad for the Scottish Division One matches against St Johnstone and Queen of the South. In the summer of 2009, Livingston went into administration and faced demotion to the Scottish Division Three. He made his debut for Livingston on 1 August 2009 in the Scottish League Cup in a 3–0 defeat to Albion Rovers, replacing Michael Torrance in the second half. He then played in the first league game of the season, a 2–0 win over Montrose, coming on as a second-half substitute for Anthony McParland.

Burnley
Burnley manager Owen Coyle brought McKee to Turf Moor in August 2009 and signed a two-year scholarship after training with the club in the summer. Burnley had to play Livingston in a pre-season friendly at Almondvale as part of the deal, and also pay a five-figure sum when he signed a professional contract. He played primarily in the youth team in his first season at the club, but did feature in six games in the Premier Reserve League scoring one goal against Bolton Wanderers. In the 2010–11 season he was top scorer for the youth team and also featured regularly in the reserve side. In June 2011, he signed his first professional contract with the club on a one-year deal after the end of his scholarship. He was involved with the first team in the 2011–12 pre-season games and played in his first game for the Clarets in a 0–0 draw with Oldham Athletic, coming on in the last minute for Ross Wallace. He was given the squad number 34 during pre-season. On 9 August 2011, McKee was named on the bench in a 6–3 win over Burton Albion in the Football League Cup first round. However, he was an unused substitute.

In April 2012, it announced that McKee was released at the end of his Contract by Burnley.

St Mirren (Loan spell)
On 23 August 2011, he joined Scottish Premier League club St Mirren on a four-month loan until January 2012. He made his debut for the club on 28 August 2011 in a 2–0 home defeat to Celtic, where he came on as a late substitute for Nigel Hasselbaink. Having made two appearances for St Mirren, McKee loan spell with the club ended, but manager Danny Lennon hopes that he will become a better player.

Bolton Wanderers
On 3 July, McKee tweeted that he had signed for Bolton Wanderers, reuniting with former Burnley manager, Owen Coyle. This was confirmed a day later by Bolton's official Twitter page and McKee was given number 35.

McKee was released by then Bolton boss Dougie Freedman at the end of the 2012–13 season, having made no appearance or even on the substitute bench in his Bolton career.

Greenock Morton
In May 2013, McKee joined Scottish club Greenock Morton, playing in the Scottish Championship. McKee signed a contract extension until summer 2015 in September 2013.

Carlisle United
McKee left Morton on a Bosman free transfer to join English side Carlisle United. He scored his first goal for Carlisle in an EFL Trophy tie against Fleetwood Town on 9 November 2016.

Falkirk
On transfer deadline day, 31 January 2017, McKee signed a 6-month deal to move back north to Falkirk, teaming up with long time friend Charlie Harris who was in the U23 squad as a physio. McKee commented "It was an easy decision. To come back up north and see Charlie clinched the deal". In November 2017 he received a four-match SFA ban for 'excessive misconduct' for his part in an incident involving Dunfermline's Dean Shiels during a match between the rival clubs two months previously.

Dumbarton 
After leaving Falkirk and spending time with Dundalk McKee signed for Scottish League One club Dumbarton in July 2019. He enjoyed a successful season at the Rock, registering 15 assists and two goals before leaving the club at the end of his contract in July 2020.

Queen of the South 
On 24 August 2020, McKee signed for Queen of the South until 31 May 2021.

Dumbarton 
After only one season at the Dumfries club, McKee returned to Dumbarton on a two-year deal in June 2021.

International
McKee has represented Scotland at under-16, under-17 and under-19 level. He was first called up to Scotland U19 squad in May 2011 for the two friendlies away to Denmark. He started in the first friendly on 10 May in Copenhagen, playing 70 minutes as Scotland lost 3–2. He was a substitute for the game two days later in Ballerup in another defeat, coming on in the second half for Rory McKenzie.

Career statistics

Honours
Greenock Morton
Scottish League One: Winners 2014–15

See also
St Mirren F.C. season 2011–12
Greenock Morton F.C. season 2013–14 | 2014–15 | 2015–16

References

External links

1989 births
Living people
Scottish footballers
Association football midfielders
Livingston F.C. players
Burnley F.C. players
St Mirren F.C. players
Bolton Wanderers F.C. players
Scottish Football League players
Scottish Premier League players
Greenock Morton F.C. players
Scotland youth international footballers
Scottish Professional Football League players
Dundee United F.C. players
Carlisle United F.C. players
Falkirk F.C. players
Dundalk F.C. players
Queen of the South F.C. players
Dumbarton F.C. players